Ugo Colombo (22 February 1940 – 10 October 2019) was an Italian racing cyclist. He rode the Giro d'Italia in 1964–1974 with Filotex, with the best result of third place in 1971, and the Tour de France in 1966–1968, placing tenth in 1968.

Grand Tour results timeline

References

1940 births
2019 deaths
Italian male cyclists
Italian Giro d'Italia stage winners
Tour de Suisse stage winners
Cyclists from the Metropolitan City of Milan
People from San Giorgio su Legnano